Rahmat Syamsuddin Leo (born 28 May 1988 in Takalar, Indonesia), also known as Rahmat (for international matches) or M. Rahmat (when there was another player in his former club with the same name), is an Indonesian professional footballer who plays as a winger for Liga 1 club Bali United. He was born with only one name, like many Indonesians, but added other names or initials throughout his career for administrative purposes.

Honours

Club
PSM Makassar
 Piala Indonesia: 2019

Bali United
 Liga 1: 2021–22

References

External links 
 
 

1988 births
Living people
Indonesian footballers
Bugis people
Sportspeople from South Sulawesi
PSM Makassar players
Bali United F.C. players
Indonesian Premier League players
Liga 1 (Indonesia) players
Association football wingers
Association football forwards
Indonesia international footballers